Robert Willis Sievwright (16 June 1882 – 12 July 1947) was a Scottish first-class cricketer from Angus.

A left arm orthodox bowler, Sievwright made his debut for Scotland against the touring South African national team in 1912 and took 6 wickets in the first innings. His following game came against Australia and he managed what would remain his career best figures of 7 for 71.

Sievwright played club cricket in Scotland for Arbroath United for whom he took 2242 wickets. He died on the pitch during a game against Perthshire after suffering a heart attack.

References

External links
Cricket Europe

1882 births
1947 deaths
Scottish cricketers
Sportspeople from Angus, Scotland